Alf Fraser nicknamed "Sonny" was an Australian professional rugby league footballer who played in the 1910s and 1920s.  He played for Balmain as a second rower but also played as a prop.

Playing career
Fraser made his debut in 1916 for Balmain against local rivals Glebe.  That same year Fraser played in the 1916 NSWRL grand final victory over Souths.  Fraser was a part of the 1917, 1919 and 1920 sides which won the premiership but the club did not need to play in a grand final those seasons as in those days an annual grand final was not mandatory.  

In 1924, Fraser claimed his fifth premiership as a Balmain player defeating Souths in the grand final 3–0.  Fraser retired the following year in 1925.  At representative level he played for New South Wales on eight occasions.

References

Australian rugby league players
Balmain Tigers coaches
Balmain Tigers players
New South Wales rugby league team players
Rugby league players from Sydney
Rugby league props